Ategumia fatualis is a moth of the family Crambidae described by Julius Lederer in 1863. It is native to Java and the Philippines, but was introduced to Hawaii and Kauai in 1958 for the control of Melastoma malabathricum.

The larvae feed on Melastoma malabathricum. They roll the leaves of their host plant.

External links
Investigations on Biological Control of melastoma (Melastoma malabathricum L.)

Moths described in 1863
Spilomelinae
Moths of Asia